Bee Thousand is the seventh album by American indie rock band Guided by Voices, released on June 21, 1994, on Scat Records. After its release the band became one of the more prominent groups associated with the "lo-fi" genre, a movement defined by the relatively low fidelity of audio releases. Musically, the album draws inspiration from British Invasion-era rock music and punk rock. Following the release of Bee Thousand, the band began to attract interest from other record labels, eventually signing with Matador for their next album.

Background
Guided by Voices is a Dayton, Ohio-based band formed in 1983. Although by 1992 the band had released five full-length albums (not including their 1986 debut EP, Forever Since Breakfast), Guided by Voices was not a band in a conventional sense; its line-up was extremely loose, consisting of whoever of a group of friends showed up to short notice recording sessions. Robert Pollard thought of Guided by Voices as more of a "songwriter's guild" than a band, and also said that "Whoever could come over would play. [...] It was just a bunch of friends who could occasionally get together so it didn't really feel like a band."

Bee Thousand was to be the original band's final album. Pollard was close to disbanding Guided by Voices by 1993, due to financial constraints and pressure to focus more on his family and teaching career; Pollard has also stated that the band was nearly broken up as early as 1991, during the creation of Propeller. Pollard was also struggling with writing for a follow-up record to Vampire on Titus and Propeller, which had been the band's two most noticed records yet. However, it occurred to him to "deconstruct" and "reconstruct" the band's older, unused material into new songs.

Recording
Unlike some of the band's earlier releases, Bee Thousand was not recorded in a studio, but rather on four-track machines or other primitive home recording devices in the garages and basements of various band members. Moreover, many of the demo takes of the songs were the ones that were used for the album. Due in part to both of these factors, several unusual errors are present in the album's recording and mixing; for example, the guitar track drops out at one point in "Hardcore UFO's". The band's choice to use inexpensive recording devices was initially a matter of economics, but eventually the band grew to prefer the sound. Pollard said that:

Kevin Fennell similarly said, "When Bee Thousand came out we sounded much less professional than we did in 1982. The music was much more spontaneous." Pollard also said that, at the time, the band's recording style was intended to sound like Beatles bootlegs. Furthermore, songs were usually completed in a minimum number of takes with no rehearsal beforehand. In all, recording for the album was extremely brief, taking only three days, with Pollard estimating that each song took roughly half an hour.

Music
The music of Bee Thousand is influenced by British Invasion rock music, as well as what Pollard calls the "four P's" of rock: pop, punk rock, progressive rock, and psychedelia. Only a few new songs were written for the album, among them "I Am a Scientist" and "Gold Star for Robot Boy", with the rest of the album mostly being overdubbed, rerecorded, or edited versions of the band's older, unused material.

While typical rock instruments, such as guitar, bass, and drums, are dominant, a variety of instruments and sounds are used. Recorders are used in "The Goldheart Mountaintop Queen Directory", and a piano is used in the closing track "You're Not an Airplane".

Lyrics
Pollard's surreal lyrical style has been compared to the cut-up technique of Beat writer William S. Burroughs. Many of the album's lyrics reflect childish or fantastical themes and were heavily influenced by the statements and actions of Pollard's fourth grade class, exemplified by "Gold Star for Robot Boy". Pollard was inspired to write "The Goldheart Mountaintop Queen Directory" after having an LSD-triggered psychedelic experience in which he perceived his own face in a mirror changing into his son's face; however, the song's lyrics are not about this event. According to Pollard, "I Am a Scientist" is "the first song that showed some maturity in my ability as a songwriter."  The lyrics for "Tractor Rape Chain" are taken from three other songs: "Still Worth Nothing", "Tractor Rape Chain (Clean It Up)", and "Tell Me".

Title and cover art
The title Bee Thousand was inspired by a group brainstorming session, during which band members smoked cannabis. Pollard's brother, Jim, thought of "zoo thousand", allegedly inspired by a mile marker reading "Z1000." This phrase coalesced with a misspelling of a movie title at a drive-in theater, with "Beethoven" spelled as "Beethouen", which Pollard liked because the misspelling sounded like the name of The Who guitarist Pete Townshend. Other considered titles included All That Glue and Instructions for the Rusty Time Machine, both of which were used in the lyrics of other Guided by Voices songs.

The caped person on the front of the album is from an image in an article by National Geographic documenting the festival of Mardi Gras in Acadiana, Louisiana.

Reception

In July 2014, Guitar World ranked Bee Thousand at number 6 in their "Superunknown: 50 Iconic Albums That Defined 1994" list.

Accolades

Track listing

Original release

Bee Thousand: The Director's Cut

Personnel
Guided by Voices

 Robert Pollard – vocals ; guitar ; other instruments 
 Jim Pollard – bass guitar ; guitar, feedback 
 Tobin Sprout – vocals ; bass guitar ; guitar ; piano ; other instruments 
 Mitch Mitchell – guitar 
 Don Thrasher – drums, percussion 
 Dan Toohey – bass guitar 
 Kevin Fennell – drums, percussion 
 Greg Demos – bass guitar 
Additional musicians

 Randy Campbell – backing vocals

References

Notes

External links
 Bee Thousand at Last.fm
 Bee Thousand at Google Music

1994 albums
Guided by Voices albums
Scat Records albums
Progressive pop albums
Albums recorded in a home studio
Avant-pop albums